Schramm Park State Recreation Area is a state recreation area in southeast Nebraska, United States, on the north side of the Platte River in Sarpy County.

The area currently has  of scenic nature trails, picnic areas, the Schramm Education Center and the Gretna State Fish Hatchery, the oldest fish hatchery in the State of Nebraska, established in 1882. The hatch house is now operated as a fish hatchery museum.

The Schramm Education Center features multiple viewing tanks with a variety of fish species. The facility also features multiple terrariums featuring reptiles, amphibians, and insects.

Schramm is accessible from Interstate 80, exit 432.

References

State parks of Nebraska
Nature centers in Nebraska
Aquaria in Nebraska
Natural history museums in Nebraska
Museums in Sarpy County, Nebraska
Protected areas of Sarpy County, Nebraska
Fish hatcheries in the United States
Agricultural buildings and structures in Nebraska